Mirza Hossein Khan Sami'i also known by his court title of Adib al Saltaneh() (1876 – 5 February 1954) was an Iranian writer, poet, diplomat and politician who had shifted in many positions in both Qajar and Pahlavi governments.

He worked first in the Foreign Ministry and then as head of the Office of Neighboring Governments. Entered the Ministry of the Interior in 1910 and was deputy of Rasht in the National Consultative Assembly 1914–1918.

Biography 
Hossein ibn Hassan Sami'i Gilani, Born in 1876 in Rasht into a notable family. Spent his childhood in Tehran and Kermanshah and studied  Arabic and literary sciences at Kermanshah, Taught by Abu al-Foqara' al-Isfahani and Mirza Salik al-Kermanshahi. He began writing poetry from the age of eleven by his pen name of ‘Aṭā. He returned to Tehran in 1893 and worked in the Foreign Ministry in the Qajari court during the reign of Muzaffar al-Din. Moved to the Ministry of Interior after the constitutional revolution in 1907, Elected as a deputy for Rasht in the third session of the National Consultative Assembly in 1914. Moved between the ministries of Interior and "General Benefits" later, Then he was appointed governor of Tehran.

He wrote few books, taught Political science and appointed as president of the Iranian Literary Academy. He also took over the head of the scout organization. In 1935 after the establishment of the First Academy of Sciences, he was elected its member.

In 1940, he was promoted to Iran's Ambassador to Afghanistan, remained in office for almost two years and then returned to the presidency of the Academy. He died on 5 February 1953 and buried in the Ibn Babawayh Cemetery, south of Tehran.

His works 
Below are a list of his works:
 Rules of writing
 Memories of immigration travel
 Poetry Diwan
 The spirit of speech
 Persian grammar
 Human desires
 Sisters
 Al-Siyasah
He also translated The history of Afghanistan by Jamal al-Din al-Afghani from Arabic to Persian.

References 

1876 births
1953 deaths
20th-century Iranian writers
20th-century Iranian poets
Iranian diplomats
Members of the National Consultative Assembly
Iranian male writers
Government ministers of Iran
People from Rasht
Deputies of Rasht for National Consultative Assembly
Ambassadors of Iran to Afghanistan
20th-century male writers